Glenwood Cemetery is a  cemetery in Park City, Utah. The site was first established in 1885 as a pioneer cemetery by silver miners. It is still in use, and has over 950 interments. It is on the National Register of Historic Places.

References

External links
 
 

1885 establishments in Utah Territory
Cemeteries on the National Register of Historic Places in Utah
Buildings and structures in Park City, Utah
National Register of Historic Places in Summit County, Utah